Avaricum was an oppidum in ancient Gaul, near what is now the city of Bourges. Avaricum, situated in the lands of the Bituriges Cubi, was the largest and best-fortified town within their territory, situated on very fertile lands. The terrain favored the oppidum, as it was flanked by a river and marshland, with only a single narrow entrance.
By the time of the Roman conquest in 52 BC the city according to Julius Caesar had a population of 40,000 people who were then almost all killed.

Siege of Avaricum

Julius Caesar, after a series of victories at Vellaunodunum, Genabum, and Noviodunum Biturigum, had arrived at Avaricum in the winter of 52 BC, intent on denying its grain and steel to the rebellious Gauls. Vercingetorix, aware that he had already been bested three times, decided to change strategy. Calling together a council of the tribes in rebellion against Rome, he convinced them to adopt the Fabian strategy of not to offer combat with Caesar's forces but to deny them supplies by the scorched earth tactic. All the towns within range of Caesar's foraging parties were destroyed, the land stripped bare and all grain removed or burned. However, Avaricum was spared that fate since the Bituriges argued the town was impossible to take and begged for their largest city not to be destroyed. Vercingetorix agreed to make the town an exception.

However, upon Caesar's appearance at the gates of Avaricum, Vercingetorix moved his army to a distance 15 miles outside town, perfectly situated so that Caesar could not leave without a battle nor could he forage at will. To add to his woes, Caesar's allies, the Aedui and the Boii, were unable to supply him, the former because they had quietly joined Vercingetorix in his rebellion, the latter because they simply did not have any food to spare. The shortage of grain was so acute that the men ate only meat, which was rare for a Roman field army. Caesar personally made the rounds among his men and told them that if the scarcity of food was too much, he would lift the siege and withdraw. His soldiers protested and refused to end a siege in disgrace when they still had to avenge the innocent Romans murdered a year earlier by the Gauls in Genabum.

Contented, Caesar designed and began to engineer an impressive siege apparatus. Starting from high ground, he built a siege terrace of sorts. Two flanking walls were made, along with two towers to be advanced fully made. Another wall was built between the flanking walls to connect them and open the front for the battle.

As construction on Caesar's siege terrace continued, Vercingetorix moved his cavalry into a camp closer to Caesar's, intent on ambushing Caesar's foraging troops. Caesar discovered that and countered by marching in the dead of night and threatening Vercingetorix's main camp. Vercingetorix then drew back to his main camp, rushing to its aid. Caesar then withdrew, since his aim had been accomplished.

After 25 grueling days of construction and contending with Gallic raids and attempts to set the whole siege terrace on fire, Caesar's apparatus was completed. Caesar ordered the towers advanced; much to his good fortune, a fierce storm struck, driving the Gallic sentries to seek cover, rather than stand watch. Taking advantage of the lack of discipline, Caesar stealthily moved his soldiers into the towers and the wall, and launched a brutal strike. The walls fell quickly, and the surviving Gauls retreated to the town centre, formed a wedge formation and were determined to fight to the end. However, the Roman legionaries failed to descend from the walls. Instead, they simply stood at ease and watched the Gauls. Panic struck the Gallic defenders, all of whom fled for wherever they thought there was an avenue of escape.

Caesar's legions were in no mood to spare any of the 40,000 Gauls within Avaricum, especially after 25 days of short rations and great frustration. Only 800 managed to escape the massacre that followed. After feeding and resting his men at Avaricum until early June, Caesar moved on Gergovia, determined to draw Vercingetorix into battle in a campaign that would eventually culminate in the Battle of Alesia.

References

Sources

 Julius Caesar, Commentaries on the Gallic War vii

52 BC
Populated places disestablished in the 1st century BC
Cher (department)
Julius Caesar
Massacres
Battle of Avaricum, Battle of
Avaricum